CJCJ may refer to:
 CJCJ, former call sign of CJAQ-FM in Calgary, Alberta, Canada
 CJCJ-FM, a radio station in Woodstock, New Brunswick
 Center on Juvenile and Criminal Justice, a nonprofit organization based in San Francisco, California